Chamaesyce is a genus of plants in the family Euphorbiaceae. Recent phylogenetic studies have shown that Chamaesyce is deeply nested within the broader Euphorbia. Specifically, Chamaesyce is very closely related to plants like Euphorbia pulcherrima, the popular poinsettia (this and related plants have also been given in their own genus, Poinsettia, but are also well nested within Euphorbia). Currently, all species have now been reclassified as species of Euphorbia. Specifically, this group now belongs to Euphorbia subgenus Chamaesyce section Anisophyllum (which can be abbreviated Euphorbia sect. Anisophyllym).  Taxonomically speaking, Chamaesyce is considered a synonym of Euphorbia.

Euphorbia sect. Anisophyllum is a large group with about 365 species. Euphorbia sect. Anisophyllum differs from other Euphorbia species in a number of characteristics. Perhaps the most important is the presence of C4 photosynthesis in all but one subsection (subsection Acutae, which represents a basal clade that is made up of species with intermediate C2 photosynthetic pathways). Other characteristics include sympodial branching, dorsi-ventral stems, asymmetric leaves, non-glandular stipules, and ecarunculate seeds.

Plants in the group (as with all other species in the genus Euphorbia) bear tiny flowering structures that look like single true flowers, as if each one were a flower with many stamens surrounding a single ovary. In fact, the structure is a cyathium (sometimes called a pseudanthium, meaning a "false flower"). It is made up of many small flowers, but with each flower reduced to only the functional organs of sexual reproduction: a single stamen or a single pistil without petals or sepals. Under magnification it can be seen that what appear to be many stamens plus the gynoecium of a single flower, actually form an inflorescence surrounded with many staminate flowers surrounding a single pistillate flower. Each individual staminate flower contributes only a single stamen and retaining no other structure apart from a vestigial stalk below the base of the stamen's filament. That stalk joins the capitulum or base of the inflorescence — the flowering head. Similarly, what appears to be the flower's ovary is the gynoecium of a single pistillate flower that has lost all the other associated organs of a flower. What appear to be the petals of an individual flower are in fact appendages produced by glands that are produced by bracts (collectively called the involucre), adapted leaves attached below the cyathium.  These bracts are fused into a cup-like structure. In some species, such as Chamaesyce albomarginata, the glandular appendages are quite showy.

References

Euphorbiaceae genera
Historically recognized angiosperm genera